Seguyola variegata is a species of fungus gnat, first described by Loïc Matile in 1990, of the family Lygistorrhinidae. Its type locality is in Cameroon. There are no subspecies.

References

Sciaroidea